Yaroslav Svorak (born 7 February 1989 in Ternopil, Ukrainian SSR) is a professional Ukrainian football forward.

Career 
He is a product of the Volyn Lutsk School System, and began his career in the Ukrainian Premier League with FC Volyn Lutsk. In 2007, he signed with FC Karpaty Lviv, and played in the Ukrainian Second League with FC Karpaty-2 Lviv. He was loaned to the Belarusian Premier League in 2011 to play with FC Dnepr Mogilev. For the remainder of the season he played in the Ukrainian First League with FC Krymteplytsia Molodizhne. He returned to Belarus in 2012 to sign with FC Slavia Mozyr, and later with Nyva Ternopil. In 2017, he went overseas to play in the Canadian Soccer League with FC Vorkuta.

References

External links
Profile on Football Squads

1989 births
Living people
Ukrainian footballers
Association football forwards
Ukrainian expatriate footballers
Expatriate footballers in Belarus
Expatriate soccer players in Canada
FC Volyn Lutsk players
FC Karpaty Lviv players
FC Karpaty-2 Lviv players
FC Dnepr Mogilev players
FC Krymteplytsia Molodizhne players
FC Slavia Mozyr players
FC Nyva Ternopil players
FC Continentals players
Ukrainian Premier League players
Belarusian Premier League players
Canadian Soccer League (1998–present) players
Ukrainian expatriate sportspeople in Canada
Ukrainian Second League players
Sportspeople from Ternopil